Life rank may refer to:

 Life peer, a nobility rank for life
 Life tenure, a political rank acquired for life
 Life Scout, a rank in the Boy Scouts of America